A number of countries and international bodies have imposed sanctions against North Korea. Currently, many sanctions are concerned with North Korea's nuclear weapons program and were imposed after its first nuclear test in 2006.

The United States imposed sanctions in the 1950s and tightened them further after international bombings against South Korea by North Korean agents during the 1980s, including the Rangoon bombing and the bombing of Korean Air Flight 858. In 1988, the United States added North Korea to its list of state sponsors of terrorism.

Sanctions against North Korea started to ease during the 1990s when South Korea's then-liberal government pushed for engagement policies with the North. The Clinton administration signed the Agreed Framework with North Korea in 1994. However, the relaxation was short-lived; North Korea continued its nuclear program and officially withdrew from the Nuclear Non-Proliferation Treaty in 2003, causing countries to reinstate various sanctions. UN Security Council Resolutions were passed after North Korea conducted nuclear tests in 2006, 2009, 2013, 2016, and 2017. Initially, sanctions were focused on trade bans on weapons-related materials and goods but expanded to luxury goods to target the elites. Further sanctions expanded to cover financial assets, banking transactions, and general travel and trade.

Supranational bodies

European Union
The European Union has imposed a series of sanctions against North Korea since 2006. These include:

 embargoing arms and related materials.
 banning the export of aviation and rocket fuel to North Korea.
 banning the trade of gold, precious metals, and diamonds with the North Korean government.
 banning the import of minerals from North Korea, with some exemptions for coal and iron ore.
 banning the export of luxury goods.
 restricting financial support for trade with North Korea.
 restricting investment and financial activities.
 inspecting and monitoring cargoes imported to and exported from North Korea.
 prohibiting certain North Korean individuals from entering the EU.

On 21 September 2017, EU banned oil exports and investments in North Korea.

United Nations Security Council

The UN Security Council has passed a number of resolutions since North Korea's first nuclear test in 2006.

 Resolution 1718, passed in 2006, demanded that North Korea cease nuclear testing and prohibited the export of some military supplies and luxury goods to North Korea. The UN Security Council Sanctions Committee on North Korea was established, supported by the Panel of Experts.
 Resolution 1874, passed after the second nuclear test in 2009, broadened the arms embargo. Member states were encouraged to inspect ships and destroy any cargo suspected of being related to the nuclear weapons program.
 Resolution 2087, passed in January 2013 after a satellite launch, strengthened previous sanctions by clarifying a state's right to seize and destroy cargo suspected of heading to or from North Korea for purposes of military research and development.
 Resolution 2094, passed in March 2013 after the third nuclear test, imposed sanctions on money transfers and aimed to shut North Korea out of the international financial system.
 Resolution 2270, passed in March 2016 after the fourth nuclear test, further strengthened existing sanctions. It banned the export of gold, vanadium, titanium, and rare earth metals. The export of coal and iron were also banned, with an exemption for transactions that were purely for "livelihood purposes."
 Resolution 2321, passed in November 2016, capped North Korea's coal exports and banned exports of copper, nickel, zinc, and silver. In February 2017, a UN panel said that 116 of 193 member states had not yet submitted a report on their implementation of these sanctions, though China had.
 Resolution 2371, passed in August 2017, banned all exports of coal, iron, lead, and seafood. The resolution also imposed new restrictions on North Korea's Foreign Trade Bank and prohibited any increase in the number of North Koreans working in foreign countries.
 Resolution 2375, passed on 11 September 2017, limited North Korean crude oil and refined petroleum product imports; banned joint ventures, textile exports, natural gas condensate and liquid imports; and banned North Korean nationals from working abroad in other countries.
 Resolution 2397, passed on 22 December 2017 after the launch of a Hwasong-15 intercontinental ballistic missile, limited North Korean crude oil and refined petroleum product imports to 500,000 barrels per year, banned the export of food, machinery and  electrical equipment, called for the repatriation of all North  Korean nationals earning income abroad within 24 months. The resolution also authorized member states to seize and inspect any vessel in their territorial waters found to be illicitly providing oil or other prohibited products to the Democratic People's Republic of Korea.

United Nations agencies are restricted in the aid they can give to North Korea because of the sanctions, but they can help with nutrition, health, water, and sanitation.

Nations

Australia
Australia has imposed a series of sanctions against North Korea since August 2017. The Australian Defence Force periodically deploys ships and aircraft to contribute to efforts to enforce the sanctions against North Korea through Operation Argos.

Canada
In 2011, the Canadian government imposed the Special Economic Measures Act (SEMA), which calls for an import and export ban and a financial services ban to North Korea.

China
In February 2017, China banned all imports of coal from North Korea for the rest of the year. China also banned exports of some petroleum products and imports of textiles from North Korea in line with United Nations resolutions.

Japan
In 2016, Japan imposed sanctions against North Korea including:

prohibiting North Korean citizens from entering Japan.
renewing the ban on North Korean ships entering Japanese ports and extending it to include other ships that have visited North Korea.
banning nuclear and missile technicians who have been to North Korea from entering Japan.

Russia
On 30 March 2010, President Dmitry Medvedev signed a decree implementing intensified United Nations Security Council sanctions against Pyongyang's nuclear programs. The presidential decree banned the purchase of weapons and relevant materials from the DPRK by government offices, enterprises, banks, organizations and individuals currently under Russia's jurisdiction. It also prohibited the transit of weapons and relevant materials via Russian territory or their export to the DPRK. Any financial aid and educational training that might facilitate North Korea's nuclear program and proliferation activities were also forbidden.

In December 2013, Russia joined the sanctions against North Korea, introduced in March by the UN Security Council (Resolution 2087). The corresponding decree signed by President Putin specified that Russian companies were prohibited to provide North Korea any technical assistance and advice in the development and production of ballistic missiles. In addition, North Korean naval vessels to call at Russian ports would be required to undergo inspection. Also, the authorities ordered to be vigilant when dealing with North Korean diplomats.

In October 2017 Russian President Vladimir Putin signed Presidential decree (ukaz)  No. 484 "On measures to implement UN Security Council resolution 2321 of November 30, 2016" imposing sanctions on North Korea in connection with the adoption of UN Security Council resolution 2321 of 30 November 2016. The decree supplements a number of applications, including a list of individuals and legal entities associated with the North Korean nuclear program or its ballistic missile program, which are subject to restrictions. The measures provided for by Security Council resolution 2321 introduce additional bans on trade, economic, banking, financial, scientific and technical cooperation with North Korea. In the trade and economic field, the purchase of copper, nickel, silver and zinc from the North Korea is prohibited. At the same time, the exception provided for by UN Security Council resolution 2270 of 2 March 2016 is retained for the project for the transit of Russian coal through Russian Railways through the North Korean port of Rajin for subsequent export to third countries. In addition, scientific and technical cooperation with the participation of persons or groups representing North Korea should be suspended, with the exception of exchanges in the field of medicine. In addition, targeted restrictions are expanding on a number of North Korean individuals and legal entities, as well as lists of products, including "luxury goods", the import and export of which is prohibited to and from North Korea. In addition, expanding the list of dual-use goods and other items whose import into the DPRK is prohibited due to their potential use for nuclear missile program of the country and other actions that violate the North Korean sanctions regime. The document also provides for a complete ban on the import of textile products from North Korea. Additional restrictions on cooperation in the transport sector were introduced in the decree: the delivery of new helicopters and ships to North Korea became prohibited; all seagoing ships owned or controlled by the North Korea should be removed from state registration; North Korean aircraft and ship inspection measures were tightened on the territory of UN member states.

South Korea 
In 2010, South Korea imposed sanctions against North Korea in response to the sinking of the South Korean naval ship, the ROKS Cheonan, known as the May 24 measures. These sanctions included:

banning North Korean ships from South Korean territorial waters.
suspending inter-Korean trade except at the Kaesong Industrial Zone.
banning most cultural exchanges.

In 2016, President Park Geun-hye ordered the Kaesong Industrial Region to close in retaliation for the nuclear test in January and the rocket launch in February.

In 2019, a UN panel accused South Korea of violating sanctions by not notifying the Security Council about its deliveries of petroleum products for use at inter-Korean joint liaison office.
Also in the Annex of the Updated Guidance on Addressing North Korea’s Illicit Shipping Practices, issued by the United States Treasury, a ship of South Korea was listed as that believed to have engaged in ship-to-ship transfers with North Korean tankers.

Taiwan
In 2017, Taiwan also banned trade with North Korea to comply with the United Nations resolutions, despite not being a member of the UN. North Korea is Taiwan's 174th largest trading partner and imported US$1.2 million and exported US$36,575 in goods from January to July 2017. A year later, former High Court judge Chiang Kuo-hua and his son, Chiang Heng had allegedly evaded North Korean sanctions by chartering a ship to transport four anthracite coals from Vietnam that summer. Both of them and two other PRC nationals were accused of assisting terrorists and forging documents.

United States
From 1950 to 2008, trade between the United States and North Korea was restricted under the Trading with the Enemy Act of 1917. After 2008, some restrictions related to the International Emergency Economic Powers Act stayed in effect. In February 2016, the North Korea Sanctions and Policy Enhancement Act of 2016 was passed which:

requires the President to sanction entities found to have contributed to North Korea's weapons of mass destruction program, arms trade, human rights abuses, or other illegal activities.
imposes mandatory sanctions on entities involved in North Korea's mineral or metal trade, which comprises a large part of North Korea's foreign exports.
requires the United States Treasury to determine whether North Korea should be listed as a "primary money laundering concern," which would trigger tough new financial restrictions.
imposes new sanctions authorities related to North Korean human rights and cybersecurity abuse.

In July 2017, after the death of tourist Otto Warmbier, the United States government banned US citizens from visiting North Korea without special validation starting 1 September 2017.

In August 2017, the Countering America's Adversaries Through Sanctions Act was passed.

On 21 September 2017, President Donald Trump issued Executive Order 13810 allowing the United States to cut from its financial system or freeze assets of any companies, businesses, organizations, and individuals trading in goods, services, or technology with North Korea. Aircraft or ships entering North Korea are banned from entering the United States for 180 days. The same restriction applies to ships which conduct ship-to-ship transfers with North Korean ships. Treasury Secretary Steven Mnuchin stated that "Foreign financial institutions are now on notice that going forward they can choose to do business with the United States or North Korea, but not both." A statement from the White House said "Foreign financial institutions must choose between doing business with the United States or facilitating trade with North Korea or its designated supporters." On 25 September 2017, the US Treasury barred the entry of North Korean nationals to the United States.

Following the abduction of a South Korean fishing vessel, additional sanctions were ordered by the Treasury on 26 October 2017, following a culmination of "flagrant" rights abuses including executions, torture, and forced labour. Seven individuals and three North Korean entities were affected by the sanctions.

On 11 July 2018, during a summit in Brussels, NATO leaders called for continued pressure and ongoing sanctions enforcement on North Korea. The group of 29 countries, including the United States, signed a declaration which called on members to maintain pressure on North Korea though also welcomed recent diplomatic progress in the region.

On 13 November 2018, U.S. Vice President Mike Pence and Japanese Prime Minister Shinzō Abe reaffirmed the need to keep sanctions on North Korea to achieve its denuclearization. On 20 December 2018, it was reported that the United States plans to review its ban on US travel to North Korea.

U.S. President Donald Trump welcomed sanctions against North Korea imposed by China and Russia.

On 12 January 2022, the U.S. Department of the Treasury's Office of Foreign Assets Control imposed sanctions on five North Korean officials accused of being responsible for procuring goods for the DPRK's weapons of mass destruction (WMD) and ballistic missile-related programs. In addition, the State Department ordered sanctions against another North Korean, a Russian man and a Russian company for their broader support of North Korea's weapons of mass destruction activities.

On 1 December 2022, U.S. National Security Advisor Jake Sullivan said that a new round of sanctions was being prepared against North Korea. Sullivan also said that the U.S. was "committed to using pressure and diplomacy to entice North Korea into giving up its nuclear arsenal."

Evasion of sanctions 
According to the United Nations Panel of Experts in April 2019, North Korea had developed a number of techniques and a complex web of organizations to enable it to evade the sanctions. The techniques included falsification of documents and covert ship-to-ship transfers of cargo at sea.

In May 2019, the United States announced it had seized a North Korean cargo vessel  for carrying a coal shipment in defiance of sanctions. The Justice Department said the 17,061-tonne Wise Honest is one of the North's largest cargo ships and she was first detained by Indonesia in April 2018 but she was now in the possession of the United States.

In 2017 and 2018, then U.S. President Donald Trump accused China and Russia of violating sanctions against North Korea.

On February 11, 2022, Taiwanese shipping company Cheng Chiun Shipping Agency Co Ltd (CCSA) is reported to have covertly assisted North Korea in providing oil to evade sanctions.

Assessment
A report by the United Nations Panel of Experts stated that North Korea was covertly trading in arms and minerals despite sanctions against this.

The academic John Delury has described the sanctions as futile and counterproductive. He has argued that they are unenforceable and unlikely to stop North Korea's nuclear weapons program.

On the other hand, Sung-Yoon Lee, Professor in Korean Studies at the Fletcher School, and Joshua Stanton advocate continued tightening of sanctions and targeting Pyongyang's systemic vulnerabilities, such as blocking the regime's "offshore hard currency reserves and income with financial sanctions, including secondary sanctions against its foreign enablers. This would significantly diminish, if not altogether deny, Kim the means to pay his military, security forces and elites that repress the North Korean public."

It is in any case admitted that the international sanctions have a negative impact on the North Korean population, in particular on their food situation, which is de facto worsening.  Indeed, the sanctions result in delays in the arrival of humanitarian and food aid.  Non-governmental organizations are thus hampered in their mission to bring this aid in time to those who need it.  In addition, the sanctions also affect, among others, the medical and agricultural sector, as well as the country's economy.

It is estimated by Kim B. Park of WHO panel that sanctions in 2018 resulted around 4000 preventable deaths due to delays in exemptions for programs by NGO's and the UN agencies that have humanitarian programs in North Korea.

The agricultural impact is highlighted in a report jointly made by the World Food Programme and the Food and Agriculture Organization. The report outlines the negative effects on irrigation and yield in food production due to restrictions in machinery, spare parts, fuels and fertilizers.

References

Further reading

External links
United Nations Documents for DPRK (North Korea)
UN Security Council Committee Established Pursuant to Resolution 1718 (2006) (Reports issued by the UN Panel of Experts, established to support of the Sanctions Committee in carrying out its mandate as specified in paragraph 12 of resolution 1718)

 
Foreign relations of North Korea
North Korea
Economy of North Korea
Specially Designated Nationals and Blocked Persons List
North Korean individuals subject to the U.S. Department of the Treasury sanctions
North Korean entities subject to the U.S. Department of the Treasury sanctions